The Rimini Proclamation was a proclamation on 30 March 1815 by Joachim Murat, who had been made king of Naples by Napoleon I. Murat had just declared war on Austria and used the proclamation to call on Italians to revolt against their Austrian occupiers and to show himself as a backer of Italian independence, in an attempt to find allies in his desperate battle to hang onto his throne. It began:

The proclamation impressed Alessandro Manzoni, who wrote a poem later that year entitled Il proclama di Rimini, but he left it unfinished after Murat's military campaign failed.

Text
 Text of the proclamation on Italian Wikisource

Napoleonic Wars
Italian unification
Proclamations
1815 in Italy
19th century in the Kingdom of Naples
March 1815 events
1815 documents
Kingdom of Naples (Napoleonic)
Joachim Murat